Akodara is a village in Sabarkantha district of Gujarat State, India. The village is administrated by Sarpanch.

The village is known to be India's first digital cashless village where most of the people use digital method to make payments between rupees 10 to 5000. In 2015, The village was adopted and developed by the ICICI Foundation as a digitised village with a rural branch of the bank.

Demography 
As of 2011, Akodara has a total number of 236 houses and population of 1191 of which 538 include are males while 653 are females according to the report published by Census India in 2011. The literacy rate of Akodara is 91.69%, higher than the state average of 75.84%. The population of children under the age of 6 years is 84 which is 7.05% of total population of Akodara, and child sex ratio is approximately 867 as compared to Gujarat state average of 890.

Most of the people are from Schedule Caste which constitutes 6.47% of total population in Akodara and 4.53% are from Schedule Tribe.

As per the report published by Census India in 2011, 401 people were engaged in work activities out of the total population of Akodara which includes 309 males and 92 females. According to census survey report 2011, 98.50% workers describe their work as main work and 1.50% workers are involved in Marginal activity providing livelihood for less than 6 months.

Animal hostel 
The cattle of the village are housed in a co-operatively managed "animal hostel" with a capacity of 900 animals. The scheme has been developed as a prototype model. It provides improved conditions for the cattle and produces compost and methane gas.

Transport 

See also 
List of villages in India

References

External links 
 District official website
 Locality Based PINCode

Villages in Sabarkantha district